Cangetta primulina is a moth in the family Crambidae. It is found in Cameroon.

References

Endemic fauna of Cameroon
Moths described in 1916
Spilomelinae